Adam Nagourney (born October 10, 1954) is an American journalist who covered the 2020 presidential race  for The New York Times.

Life and career
Nagourney was born in New York City and graduated from the State University of New York at Purchase in 1977 with a B.A. in economics.

He began his career at the Gannett Westchester Newspaper (now The Journal News), where he worked from 1977 to 1983 as a reporter in Putnam County, White Plains, and northern Westchester County. He then worked for the New York Daily News (1983–90) and USA Today (1990–1993), where he covered Bill Clinton's 1992 presidential campaign and the first year of the Clinton White House.

After joining The New York Times in 1996, Nagourney was assigned to cover the presidential campaign of Bob Dole. After the 1996 election, he became the paper's metropolitan political correspondent in New York. He was appointed chief political correspondent in 2002 and covered the 2004 re-election of President George W. Bush and the 2008 election of Barack Obama. He became the paper's Los Angeles bureau chief in the summer of 2010. In April 2020, he join the politics desk, helping to cover the 2020 presidential campaign for the Times.

On June 16, 2015, Nagourney was one of three reporters on an article published in The New York Times titled "Deaths of Irish Students in Berkeley Balcony Collapse Cast Pall on Program". The article described students in the J-1 visa program as "a source of embarrassment for Ireland". Nagourney said, "Do I think that the program – as well as the problems associated with it – are fair game for a news story? Yes. But there was a more sensitive way to tell the story. I absolutely was not looking to in any way appear to be blaming the victims, or causing pain in this awful time for their families and friends. I feel very distressed at having added to their anguish."

Nagourney is openly gay, as was his predecessor as chief political correspondent at the Times, Rick Berke. His brother, Eric Nagourney, is an editor at the Times.

Bibliography
 With Dudley Clendinen. Out for Good: The Struggle to Build a Gay Rights Movement in America New York: Simon and Schuster, 1999.

References

External links
Stories by Nagourney for The New York Times

1954 births
Living people
American newspaper reporters and correspondents
American gay writers
The New York Times writers
State University of New York at Purchase alumni
American LGBT journalists
20th-century American journalists
American male journalists
21st-century LGBT people